The Spitzkunnersdorfer Bach  is a small river of Saxony, Germany. It flows into the Landwasser in Oderwitz.

See also
List of rivers of Saxony

Rivers of Saxony
Upper Lusatia
Rivers of Germany